Todd Gava (born 20 January 1981 in Lismore, New South Wales, Australia) is an Australian footballer.

References

1981 births
Living people
A-League Men players
Association football fullbacks
Australian soccer players
Brisbane Roar FC players
People from the Northern Rivers
Brisbane Strikers FC players
Sportsmen from New South Wales
Soccer players from New South Wales